Mark S. Workentin is a professor of Organic Chemistry at the University of Western Ontario.  The primary interests of the Workentin research group are materials chemistry, organic electrochemistry, organic photochemistry, physical organic chemistry and physical materials organic electrophotochemistry.

Education
 Ph.D. in 1992 from McMaster University
 B.Sc. in 1988 from the University of Western Ontario

Academic and research experience
 University Faculty Scholar, The University of Western Ontario: 2005–2007
 Professor of Chemistry, The University of Western Ontario: 2005–present
 Associate Professor, The University of Western Ontario: 2000–2005
 Assistant Professor, The University of Western Ontario: 1995–2000
 Associate Research Officer, National Research Council: 1994–1995
 Steacie Institute For Molecular Sciences
 Organic Reactions Dynamic Group
 Research Associate, National Research Council: 1992–1994

Awards and honours
 University Faculty Scholar
 Premier's Research Excellence Award
 Marilyn Robinson Award for Excellence in Teaching
 Alumni Western, Bank of Nova Scotia, University Students' Council Award for Excellence in Undergraduate Teaching (1997–98, 2001–02)
 Canadian National Congress-International Union Pure and Applied Chemistry (CNC-IUPAC) Award
 Ontario Confederation of University Faculty Associations Award for Excellence in University Teaching
 USC Teaching Honour Roll (2001–2005)
 NRC Research Associateship (1992–1994)
 NSERC Postdoctoral Scholarship (1992) – declined to take position at NRC
 NSERC Doctoral Prize finalist (1993)
 NSERC Postgraduate Scholarships (1988–1992)
 McMaster University Centennial Scholarships for Academic Excellence (1988–1992)

External links
 Chemistry at UWO
 Workentin Research Group

References

Academic staff of the University of Western Ontario
Organic chemists
Year of birth missing (living people)
Living people
University of Western Ontario alumni
McMaster University alumni